Zhenxin Xincun is a station that is part of Line 14 of the Shanghai Metro. Located at the intersection of South Qilianshan Road and Tongchuan Road in the city's Jiading District, the station opened with the rest of Line 14 on December 30, 2021. It is currently the terminal station of the short-route trains of Line 14.

References 

Railway stations in Shanghai
Shanghai Metro stations in Jiading District
Line 14, Shanghai Metro
Railway stations in China opened in 2021